Aquabacterium citratiphilum is a Gram-positive, catalase-negative bacterium from the genus Aquabacterium and  family Comamonadaceae, which was isolated with Aquabacterium commune and Aquabacterium parvum  from biofilms of drinking water in Berlin.

References

External links
Type strain of Aquabacterium citratiphilum at BacDive -  the Bacterial Diversity Metadatabase

Comamonadaceae
Bacteria described in 1998